Honeymoon Hotel is a 1964 American Romantic comedy film, directed by Henry Levin for  Metro-Goldwyn-Mayer. It stars Robert Goulet, Nancy Kwan, Robert Morse, and Jill St. John.

The movie, which contains four songs, is a sex farce about two male friends who find themselves at a hotel that is supposed to be for honeymooners only. Unusual for its time, the film centers on an interracial romance (involving characters played by Robert Goulet and Nancy Kwan) but the racial difference is never mentioned or even alluded to.

Plot
When the wedding of a bridegroom falls apart, he and his best man, a bachelor, use the already booked and paid-for suite in a Caribbean resort dedicated to honeymooning couples.

Cast

 Robert Goulet as Ross Kingsley
 Nancy Kwan as Lynn Hope
 Robert Morse as Jay Menlow
 Jill St. John as Sherry Nugent
 Keenan Wynn as Mr. Sampson
 Anne Helm as Cynthia Hampton
 Elsa Lanchester as Chambermaid

 Bernard Fox as Room Clerk
 Elvia Allman as Mrs. Sampson
 Sandra Gould as Mabel - Switchboard Operator
 David Lewis as Mr. Hampton
 Chris Noel as Nancy Penrose
 Dale Malone as Fatso
 Paulene Myers as Hogan - Ross's Secretary

See also
 List of American films of 1964

References

External links

 Honeymoon Hotel at the Internet Movie Database
 
 
 

1964 films
American sex comedy films
1964 comedy films
Films directed by Henry Levin
Films scored by Walter Scharf
Metro-Goldwyn-Mayer films
Films set in hotels
1960s English-language films
1960s American films